Bell tower is one category of the Thai architectural structure in a wat for signaling the monks to do their praying ceremony.

Type of structure
 Wood
 Masonry
 Reinforced Concrete
 Composite

Shape
 Square
 Hexagonal
 Octagonal
 Circle

Roof styles
 Gable with Thai classical ornament
 Mondop
 Tetrahedron 
 Pavilion Crown
 Thai Crown
 Chedi (bell-shaped)
 Prang
 Thai castle superstructure ornament
 Western, Chinese or other architectural style
 Combination

Buddhism’s meaning, symbol and philosophy
 Wake up, attained the Truth and feeling of Peacefulness.

External links
 Thai Architecture
 Buddhist Art: Architecture Pt.1
 Wat Phra Kaew’s Bell Tower
 Wat Pho’s Bell Tower
 Wat Samrong’s Bell Tower

References
 Karl Döhring, Buddhist Temples of Thailand: An Architectonic Introduction, White Lotus Press, 2000.